Amurensin may refer to:
 Amurensin (flavonol), a flavonol found in Phellodendron amurense
 Amurensin A, a resveratrol dimer found in Vitis amurensis
 Amurensin B, a stilbenoid trimer found in Vitis amurensis
 Amurensin C, a resveratrol trimer found in Vitis amurensis
 Amurensin D, a resveratrol trimer found in Vitis amurensis
 Amurensin E, a resveratrol pentamer found in Vitis amurensis
 Amurensin F, a resveratrol pentamer found in Vitis amurensis
 Amurensin G, a resveratrol trimer found in Vitis amurensis 
 Amurensin H, a resveratrol dimer found in Vitis amurensis
 Amurensin I, a resveratrol tetramer found in Vitis amurensis
 Amurensin J, a resveratrol tetramer found in Vitis amurensis
 Amurensin K, a resveratrol tetramer found in Vitis amurensis
 Amurensin L, a resveratrol tetramer found in Vitis amurensis
 Amurensin M, a resveratrol tetramer found in Vitis amurensis

See also 
 Amurensine, an alkaloid found in some Papaver species

References